Pinhaisania is a genus of moths belonging to the family Tortricidae.

Species
Pinhaisania crispula Razowski & Becker, 2000

See also
List of Tortricidae genera

References

  2000: SHILAP revista de Lepidopterologia 28: 387.

External links
tortricidae.com

Euliini
Tortricidae genera